Syed Asif Masood Shah (born 23 January 1946) is a former Pakistani cricketer who played in 16 Test matches and 7 One Day Internationals from 1969 to 1977. He was educated at Islamia College Lahore.

His best Test was against England at Birmingham in 1971, when he took 5 for 111 and 4 for 49. This performance led to his selection for the Rest of the World team in Australia in 1971–72.

He used to begin his run-up with a backward step before a loping approach to the wicket which John Arlott likened to "Groucho Marx chasing a pretty waitress".

Retiring from cricket in 1977, after marrying in the UK, Asif Masood became a successful businessman, owning first a travel agency then a post office in Bury, Lancashire. He currently resides in Bury with his wife and four children.

References

1946 births
Living people
Pakistani cricketers
Pakistan Test cricketers
Pakistan One Day International cricketers
Cricketers at the 1975 Cricket World Cup
Lahore cricketers
Punjab University cricketers
Pakistan Universities cricketers
Pakistan International Airlines cricketers
Northumberland cricketers
Cricketers from Lahore
Lahore Whites cricketers
Lahore Greens cricketers
Pakistan International Airlines A cricketers
North Zone (Pakistan) cricketers
South Zone (Pakistan) cricketers
Government Islamia College alumni
People from Lahore